This is a list of the largest evangelical church auditoriums. The list is based on the human seating capacity of the evangelical church auditoriums.

Characteristics 
The building of an Evangelical Christian megachurch has a main auditorium for  worship services, as well as additional rooms for children and teenagers, small groups and sometimes a cafeteria or a gym.

Criteria for inclusion 
 Only church auditoriums are included in this list. Church tents, canopies and overflows are excluded from the list. For example, the Redeemed Christian Church of God multimillion-capacity church campground fails this criterion as it is not a completely enclosed building.
 The figures are based on seating capacity of the auditorium from weekly services. Figures from monthly/yearly conventions, congress and outreaches are not factored in this list. For this reason, the seven million plus average attendees to the convention of Redeemed Christian Church of God is not included in this list as it is not a weekly service.
 The estimates are based on human seating capacity in a single service. Churches with multiple consecutive services will be for only one service. For example, Faith Tabernacle, which holds four services every Sunday in its 50,000 capacity auditorium will be included as having 50,000 and not 200,000 in the list.
 Only auditoriums with a capacity of 10,000 and above are to be included.

List

See also
 List of the largest evangelical churches
 Worship service (evangelicalism)

References 

Auditoriums
Evangelical
Lists of construction records
Evangelical megachurches
Lists of churches
Church, evangelical